Procynops is an extinct genus of prehistoric amphibian.

See also

 Prehistoric amphibian
 List of prehistoric amphibians

References

Cenozoic salamanders
Miocene amphibians
Prehistoric amphibians of Asia
Fossil taxa described in 1965